Sunder Nursery, formerly called Azim Bagh or Bagh-e-Azeem, is a 16th-century heritage park complex adjacent to the Humayun's Tomb, a UNESCO World Heritage Site in Delhi. Originally known as Azim Bagh and built by the Mughals in the 16th century, it lies on the Mughal-era Grand Trunk Road, and is spread over 90 acres (36 hectare). Future plans aim to link nearby areas to develop it into India's largest park covering 900 acres.

Today Sunder Nursery contains fifteen heritage monuments of which 6 are UNESCO World Heritage Sites, including Archaeological Survey of India (ASI) protected Sundarwala Burj, Sundarwala Mahal and Lakkarwala Burj.

After renovations starting in 2007, the nursery reopened to public as a heritage park on 21 February 2018. Now it contains over 300 types of trees, making it Delhi's first arboretum.

During the British rule, the nursery was established to grow experimental plants, it also has a lake. which gave it its current designation as a nursery. The "Sunder" part of the name comes from the Sunder Burj tomb located in the same premises. Although the name Sunder Nursery has still held, the park has been quoted to be a 'Delhi's Central Park' after renovations (though not to be confused with the central park in Connaught Place, New Delhi).

Restoration

Nizamuddin Urban Renewal Project 
Sunder nursey is part of the larger Nizamuddin Urban Renewal Project master plan of the Aga Khan Trust, which involves restoration work on 30 nearby heritage structures. Once complete, the park and resorted monuments will cover 900 acres (3.64 km sq). Since 2007 conservation of over 50 monuments have taken place of which 12 were designated World Heritage Sites by UNESCO in 2016.

Future plans aim to run the area as a public-private partnership (PPP) between the various government authorities in India and the Aga Khan Trust.

Organisation and agencies involved 
The garden complex is undergoing an extensive restoration project, undertaken by Aga Khan Trust for Culture India, jointly with Archaeological Survey of India (ASI) and Central Public Works Department (CPWD) which currently runs the garden.

All the agencies involved in this extensive restoration project are -

 Ministry of Housing and Urban Affairs, Government of India
 Archaeological Survey of India
 Central Public Works Department
 South Delhi Municipal Corporation
 US Ambassador's Fund for Cultural Preservation
 Norwegian Agency for Development Cooperation

Restoration of nursery 
Plans for the project were drawn in 2007, and work on the third phase was initiated in 2010 and completed in 2018, with 90 acres of the park being opened to the public on 21 February 2018. The vice-president of India, M Venkaiah Naidu, was present during the inauguration along with various other dignitaries including the Aga Khan founder and chairman of the Aga Khan Development Network.

Lying abandoned for decades much of the area was overgrown, and during the initial work some 1,000 trucks of rubble was removed, before the ground was levelled and subsequently classical Persian gardens were recreated, with fountains and water channels. Two main architectural features were restored. The Lakkarwala Burj tomb is now set in a new rose garden, while the 16th-century Sunderwala Burj tomb was restored as per the orange sandstone and white lime mortar used in its original design. Its red sandstone interior walls saw entire sections of white Quranic verses being recreated. The garden replicates the four micro-habitat zones which were part of Delhi's original landscape namely Kohi (ridge), Bangar (alluvial), Khadar (riverine) and Dabar (marsh).

Important features

Monuments 
UNESCO World Heritage status has been given to the following six structures within Sunder Nursery - Sunder Burj, Sundarwala Mahal, Lakkarwala Burj, Mirza Muazzafar Hussain's Tomb, Chotta Bateshewala and the Unknown Mughal's tomb.

Wildlife

Flora 

The area contains over 280 native tree species. Using GIS 4200 trees have been mapped. Apart from this there are around 80 types of bird species and 36 types of butterflies. The Bonsai House is home to some bonsai over 80 years old.

Trees 
Sunder Nursery is Delhi's first arboretum. It is home to some rare trees such as a Pink Cedar (Acrocarpus fraxinifolius), the only one in Delhi. Various other trees in the nursery are also only found here and nowhere else in Delhi such as Chukka (Croton roxburghii) and Carrotwood (Cupaniopsis anacardioides).

A partial listing of trees and plants found -

Roses 
The rose gardens host various types of roses. A partial list of rose varieties -

HT RosesMiniature Roses
 Don Don
 Merlin

Fauna

Birds 
80 different species of birds have been located in the area through bird mapping. In 2014, the rare Ultramarine Flycatcher was spotted in the park area, a bird never seen before in New Delhi for many years. 36 types of butterfly have also been spotted in the park. A partial listing of birds include -

Butterflies 
A partial listing of butterfly varieties found -

Gallery

See also 
 Lodi Gardens

References

External links

 
 
 

Gardens in India
Tourist attractions in Delhi
Aga Khan Trust for Culture projects
16th-century establishments in India
 
Monuments of National Importance in Delhi